Abby-Mae Parkinson (born 30 July 1997) is an English professional racing cyclist, who currently rides for UCI Women's Continental Team  in road racing, and UCI Cyclo-cross Team  in cyclo-cross. Her mother Lisa Brambani is a former racing cyclist who won a silver medal in the road race at the 1990 Commonwealth Games. Parkinson rode in the women's road race at the 2016 UCI Road World Championships, finishing in 79th place.

Early life
Parkinson attended Bradford Grammar School from the age of seven until her completion of A levels in biology, geography and physical education.

Major results
2018
1st  Young rider classification Setmana Ciclista Valenciana

References

External links

 
 

1997 births
Living people
English female cyclists
Sportspeople from Dewsbury
Cyclo-cross cyclists
21st-century English women